Beloglazovo (also referred to as Byeloglazovo) is a village located in southwestern Siberia in Shipunovsky District, Altai Krai, Russia. It is located on the Charysh River. There is 12 streets.

References

Rural localities in Shipunovsky District